Fathabad (also Romanized as Fatḩābād) is a village in Bardesareh Rural District, Oshtorinan District, Borujerd County, Lorestan Province, Iran. At the 2006 census, its population was 29, in 9 families.

References 

Towns and villages in Borujerd County